Inside Australia is a weekly documentary series, produced and broadcast by the Special Broadcasting Service. It premiered at 7:00 pm on Sunday 12 October 2003.

See also 
 List of Australian television series

References

External links 
 

2000s Australian documentary television series
Special Broadcasting Service original programming
2003 Australian television series debuts